Rājmā , also known as rajmah, rāzmā, or lal lobia, is a vegetarian dish, originating from the Indian subcontinent, consisting of red kidney beans in a thick gravy with many Indian whole spices, and is usually served with rice. It is a part of regular diet in India, Nepal, Bangladesh and Punjab province of Pakistan. The dish developed after the red kidney bean was brought to the Indian subcontinent from Mexico. Rajma chawal is kidney beans served with boiled rice.

Regional variants 
Rajma is a popular dish in the Northern states of India, as well as in Pakistan and Nepal.

Some of the best Rajma is said to be grown in the north Indian states of Himachal Pradesh, Uttarakhand and the Jammu region of Jammu and Kashmir. Rajma Chawal served with chutney of Anardana (Pomegranate) is a famous dish in Peerah, a town in Ramban district of Jammu & Kashmir, and Assar/Baggar in Doda district of Jammu & Kashmir.

Going further, the Rajma of Chinta Valley in Doda district, a short distance from the town of Bhaderwah of Jammu province are said to be amongst the most popular. These are smaller in size than most Rajma grown in plains and have a slightly sweetish taste.

The combination of Rajma and rice generally lists as a top favorite of North Indians and Nepalis. Rajma is prepared with onion, garlic and many spices in India, and it is one of the staple foods in Nepal.

Rajma Masala is a popular dish in the Northern states of India, as well as in Pakistan. The Punjabi way of cooking Rajma Masala is to soak the kidney beans overnight in water, cook them in a pressure cooker and then mix in bhuna masala made with chopped onions, diced tomato, ginger, garlic and a mélange of spices including cumin, coriander, turmeric, garam masala and chili powder.

Nutrition 
A 100 gram serving of boiled Rajma beans contains about 140 calories, 5.7 grams of protein, 5.9 grams of fat and 18 grams of carbohydrate.

See also
 
 List of legume dishes
 Indian cuisine
 Gigandes plaki, a similar Greek dish
 Pilaki and Piyaz, similar Turkish bean dishes
 Red beans and rice, a Louisiana Creole specialty

References

External links
 

Indian cuisine
Pakistani cuisine
Nepalese cuisine
Punjabi cuisine
Legume dishes
Indian legume dishes
Culture of Delhi